The American Public Health Association (APHA) is a Washington, D.C.-based professional membership and advocacy organization for public health professionals in the United States. APHA is the largest professional organization of public health professionals in the United States. APHA host the largest gathering of public health professionals in the world at their annual meeting and exhibition.

History 
In 1872, American Public Health Association was founded by a group of physicians, including Dr. Stephen Smith and Dr. Henry Hartshorne.  APHA has been involved in every major significant public health program of the last 150 years. A list of major milestones can be found on their website, completed in celebration of their 150th anniversary.

Description 
APHA has more than 25,000 members worldwide.  The association defines itself as an organization that: "champions the health of all people and all communities. We strengthen the public health profession. We speak out for public health issues and policies backed by science. We are the only organization that combines a 150-plus year perspective, a broad-based member community and the ability to influence federal policy to improve the public's health." It defines its mission as:  "Improve the health of the public and achieve equity in health status."

The organization is divided into sections, special interest groups, affiliates, forums, and caucuses. Sections are the primary organizing units in APHA composed of individuals with shared interest in topics, practice areas, or conditions. Affiliates are state-based public health associations. Forums are cross-organization bodies around an interdisciplinary health topic. Special interest groups are groups organizing themselves into a section. Caucuses are outside professional organizations that are organized around social issues or populations in official relation with APHA.

Governance 
APHA is governed by a 24 member executive board, and led by an executive committee composed of a chair, vice-chair, president (elect and immediate), speaker, and treasurer. The legislative body of the organization is the governing council, which is composed of voting and non-voting members. Each part of the association is self-governed.

Membership 
APHA has five types of membership: regular, retired, early-career professional, organizational, and student. Members receive an online subscription to the American Journal of Public Health and The Nation's Health as well as a weekly newsletter, Inside Public Health.

APHA awards

National APHA awards

The accomplishments of public health leaders are recognized through an awards program. APHA presents its national awards during its annual meeting. National APHA awards include:

 Sedgwick Memorial Medal
 APHA Award for Excellence
 David P. Rall Award for Advocacy
 Helen Rodríguez Trías Award
 Lyndon Haviland Public Health Mentoring Award 
 Martha May Eliot Award
 Milton and Ruth Roemer Prize
 Victor W. Sidel and Barry S. Levy Award for Peace
 Ayman El-Mohandes Young Professional Public Health Innovation Award

Section awards
The Public Health Education and Health Promotion section recognizes individuals in six award categories. The awards include the Distinguished Career Award, Early Career Award, Mayhew Derryberry Award for contributions of behavioral scientists to health education, Mohan Sing Award for humor in health education, Sarah Mazelis Award for health education practitioners, and Rogers Award for public health communication.

The Statistics section offers the Mortimer Spiegelman Award to a statistician under the age of 40 for contribution to public health statistics.

Sponsored awards

Rema Lapouse Award – sponsored by the Mental Health, Epidemiology, and Statistics Sections, this award is granted to an outstanding scientist in the area of psychiatric epidemiology.

Publications 

The American Public Health Association publishes more than 70 public health books. Several of these are the reference source for their specialty within public health practice. Some publication titles include:

 Control of Communicable Diseases Manual
 Standard Methods for the Examination of Water and Wastewater
 Landesman's Public Health Management of Disasters: The Practice Guide 
 Public Health Newswire

In addition, APHA publishes the American Journal of Public Health, a monthly peer-reviewed public health journal covering public health and policy. APHA also publishes The Nation's Health, a monthly newspaper covering public health news and APHA updates.

Annual meeting 

The APHA Annual Meeting and Exposition is the largest meeting of public health professionals in the world. The meeting draws more than 13,000 attendees, offers 700 booths of exhibits and features more than 1,000 scientific sessions. Presentations cover new research and trends in public health science and practice.

National Public Health Week 

National Public Health Week is an observance organized annually by APHA during the first full week of April. The week’s activities are designed to highlight issues that are important to improving the public’s health.

Affordable Care Act 
In June 2019, The American Public Health Association firmly condemned official litigation with the United States of America by the Trump administration. At the end of the Trump administration, the APHA opposed a legal filing with the Supreme Court which would have repealed the Affordable Care Act.  This Supreme Court case was decided in June 2021, and the court left the Affordable Care Act in place.

Mortimer Spiegelman Award

 1970: Edward Perrin
 1971: P. A. Lachenbruch
 1972: Manning Feinleib
 1973: Joseph L. Fleiss
 1974: Gary G. Koch
 1975: Jane Menken
 1976: A. A. Afifi
 1977: David Hoel
 1978: Ross Prentice
 1979: Mitchell H. Gail
 1980: Norman Breslow
 1981: Robert F. Woolson
 1982: Joel Kleinman
 1983: J. Richard Landis
 1984: Stephen Lagakos
 1985: John Crowley (statistician)
 1986: Anastasios Tsiatis 
 1987: L. J. Wei
 1988: Thomas Fleming (statistician)
 1989: Colin B. Begg
 1990: Kung-Yee Liang
 1991: Scott L. Zeger
 1992: Ronald S. Brookmeyer
 1993: Martin Abba Tanner
 1994: Louise M. Ryan
 1995: Christopher J. Portier
 1996: Jeremy M. G. Taylor 
 1997: Margaret S. Pepe
 1998: Peter Bacchett 
 1999: Danyu Lin
 2000: Bradley P. Carlin 
 2001: Daniel E. Weeks 
 2002: Xihong Lin
 2003: Michael Abbott Newton
 2004: Mark van der Laan
 2005: Rebecca Betensky
 2006: Francesca Dominici
 2007: David Dunson
 2008: Hongyu Zhao 
 2009: Rafael Irizarry
 2010: Nilanjan Chatterjee
 2011: Sudipto Banerjee
 2012: Amy Herring
 2013: Debashis Ghosh 
 2014: Tyler VanderWeele
 2015: John D. Storey
 2016: Roger D. Peng
 2017: Limin Peng
 2018: Raphael Gottardo
 2019: Daniela Witten
 2020: Jeffrey T. Leek

References

External links 
America's Health Rankings
State Health Stats
American Public Health Association - APHA
Campaign for Children's Health Care
American Journal of Public Health - AJPH
The Nation's Health
Get Ready Campaign
National Public Health Week
Standard Methods for the Examination of Water and Wastewater
Public Health Newswire

Public health organizations
Medical and health organizations based in Washington, D.C.
Health care-related professional associations based in the United States
Health education organizations
Organizations established in 1872
1872 establishments in Washington, D.C.